Syrophenikan is the third studio album by Canadian ambient/electronic music group Delerium in 1990.

Track listing
"Embodying" – 5:06
"Shroud" – 4:44
"Of the Tribe" – 5:10
"Fallen Idols" – 5:13
"Mythos" – 6:19
"Prophecy" – 5:17
"Twighlight Ritual" (sic) – 6:32
"Rising" (not on re-release) – 7:21
"Covert" (not on re-release) – 5:05
"Brainwaves" (Bonus track on re-release) – 8:56

Delerium albums
1990 albums